The 1956 Round Australia Trial, officially the Ampol Trial was the fourth running of the Round Australia Trial. The rally took place between 15 and 29 July 1956. The event covered 10,460 kilometres around Australia. It was won by Wilfred Murrell and Allan Taylor, driving a Peugeot 403.

Results

References

Rally competitions in Australia
Round Australia Trial